The A27 motorway is a motorway in the Netherlands. It is approximately 109 kilometers in length.

The A27 is located in the Dutch provinces North Brabant, South Holland, Utrecht, North Holland, and Flevoland. It connects the city of Breda with Almere. On its way, it passes the cities of Gorinchem, Utrecht and Hilversum.

Route description

'Shared section' with A58 motorway

Although not officially a part of the Rijksweg 27, the section of the A58 motorway between interchanges Galder and Sint-Annabosch is also being referred to as A27, next to the road's official reference number A58.

Technically this situation is incorrect, since the A27's official start is only at interchange Sint-Annabosch.  However, the reference A27 has probably been added to the road signs to help traffic coming from Antwerp in finding their way from the A16 / E19 towards the A27.

European routes

No major European routes follow the A27 motorway. The only one to follow it, is the E311 road between interchange Sint-Annabosch near Breda and interchange Lunetten near Utrecht. This section of the A27 immediately comprises the entire E311 road, since it does not follow any other roads.

Besides, the 'shared section' with the A58 is part of the European route E312.

History
The northernmost section, connecting the town of Huizen with Almere, has been opened in 1999.

Exit list

See also
List of motorways in the Netherlands
List of E-roads in the Netherlands

References

External links

Motorways in the Netherlands
Motorways in Flevoland
Motorways in North Brabant
Motorways in North Holland
Motorways in South Holland
Motorways in Utrecht (province)
Transport in Breda
Transport in Utrecht (city)